Ireland competed in the Junior Eurovision Song Contest 2022, which was held on 11 December 2022 in Yerevan, Armenia. Irish broadcaster TG4 selected Sophie Lennon to represent the country through the televised national final Junior Eurovision Éire, with the competing song "Solas" being internally selected. Being from County Down, Lennon was the first singer from Northern Ireland to compete at Junior Eurovision.

Background 

In , Anna Kearney represented the country with the song "Banshee", finishing 12th out of 19 entries with 73 points. Despite having initially confirmed their participation in the  contest in Warsaw, Poland in January 2020, TG4 announced in August 2020 that they would not participate in the contest due to the COVID-19 pandemic. In the 2021 contest, Maiú Levi Lawlor represented country in Paris, France with the song " (Disappear)". He ended 18th out of 19 entries with 44 points.

Before Junior Eurovision

Junior Eurovision Éire 2022 
Irish broadcaster TG4 once again used the national selection format Junior Eurovision Éire to select it's representative. The details of the competition were revealed on 22 August 2022, during the TG4 autumn schedule launch. Louise Cantillon returned to host the show for the second year in a row, with Darragh Ó Caoimh serving as a co-host. This was the first edition of Junior Eurovision Éire to have two main presenters. As in previous editions, an in-studio jury decided the results in the four heats and semi-final. As with the past two editions of the contest, the participants in Junior Eurovision Éire performed Irish-language cover versions of famous songs during the competition.

Jury members 
As in previous editions, the results of the four heats and semi-final were decided by an in-studio jury of two permanent members and revolving guest judges. The two permanent judges are:

 Niamh Ní Chróinín – Radio presenter, manager of Irish-language youth radio station Raidió Rí-Rá
 Chris Greene – RTÉ 2fm presenter

Heat 1
The first heat was broadcast on 18 September 2022, with Niamh Kavanagh as the guest judge. Lara Gleeson received the highest number of stars and advanced directly to the semi-final, while Calre Keeley and Ella Kelly advanced to the sing-off stage and performed their covers a second time. After their second performances, the jury members selected Clare as the winner, granting her a spot in the semi-final.

Heat 2
The second heat was broadcast on 25 September 2022, with Ryan O'Shaughnessy as the guest judge. Amber Dawes received the highest number of stars and advanced directly to the semi-final, while Marley-Peig Leonard and Éinín Duggun advanced to the sing-off stage and performed their covers a second time. After their second performances, the jury members selected Marley-Peig as the winner, granting a spot in the semi-final.

Heat 3
The third heat was broadcast on 2 October 2022, with Paul Harrington as the guest judge. Niamh Noade received the highest number of stars and advanced directly to the semi-final, while Caillín Joe McDonald and Teagan Nolan advanced to the sing-off stage and performed their covers a second time. After their second performances, the jury members selected Caillín Joe as the winner, granting a spot in the semi-final.

Heat 4
The third heat was broadcast on 9 October 2022, with Linda Martin as the guest judge. Sophie Lennon received the highest number of stars and advanced directly to the semi-final, while Phoebe McIvor and Lauren Wallace advanced to the sing-off stage and performed their covers a second time. After their second performances, the jury members selected Phoebe as the winner, granting a spot in the semi-final.

Semi-final 
The third heat was broadcast on 16 October 2022, with Brooke Scullion as the guest judge. Sophie Lennon and Niamh Noade were both chosen by the jury to advance directly to the final. Clare Keeley and Lara Gleeson were both chosen to go through to the sing-off stage and performed their covers a second time. After their second performances, the jury members selected Clare as the winner, granting a spot in the final.

Final 
The final took place on 23 October 2022, with Brian Kennedy as the guest judge. The jury of two permanent members and one rotating member was present once again to give feedback to the contestants, but did not have any voting power. For the first time ever, the winner was selected exclusively by public online vote that ran on the TG4 Junior Eurovision website from 17 October until the end of a 15-minute voting period during the broadcast.

At Junior Eurovision 
After the opening ceremony, which took place on 5 December 2022, it was announced that Ireland would perform ninth on 11 December 2022, following Georgia and preceding North Macedonia. 

In the final, Ireland finished the competition in fourth place with 150 points, including 12 points from both the Maltese and Serbian juries. This marked the best result for Ireland in Junior Eurovision to date.

Voting

Detailed voting results

References 

Ireland
2022
Junior Eurovision Song Contest
Junior Eurovision Song Contest